

P

Pa 

 

 

 

 

 

Pääkkönenite (stibnite: IMA1980-063) 2.DB.05    (IUPAC: diantimony arsenic disulfide)
Paarite (meneghinite: IMA2001-016) 2.HB.05a    (Cu1.7Pb1.7Bi6.3S12)
Pabstite (benitoite: IMA1964-022) 9.CA.05    (IUPAC: barium tin nonaoxotrisilicate)
Paceite (IMA2001-030) 10.AA.30    (IUPAC: calcium copper diacetate hexahydrate)
Pachnolite (Y: 1863) 3.CB.40    (IUPAC: sodium calcium alumino hexafluoride monohydrate)
Packratite (polyoxometalate: IMA2014-059) 4.0  [no] [no]
Paddlewheelite (IMA2017-098) 5.0  [no] [no]
Paděraite (cuprobismutite: IMA1983-091) 2.JA.10e   
Padmaite (IMA1990-048) 2.EB.25    (IUPAC: lead bismuth selenide)
Paganoite (IMA1999-043) 8.BH.50   [no] (IUPAC: nickel bismuth(III) oxoarsenate)
Pahasapaite (beryllophosphate zeolite: IMA1983-060b) 8.CA.25   
Painite (Y: 1957) 6.AB.85   
Pakhomovskyite (IMA2004-021) 8.CE.40    (IUPAC: tricobalt diphosphate octahydrate)
Palarstanide (stillwaterite: IMA1976-058) 2.AC.20b    (IUPAC: pentapalladium di(stannide,arsenide))
Palenzonaite (garnet: IMA1986-011) 8.AC.25    (IUPAC: (sodium dicalcium) dimanganese(II) trivanadate)
Palermoite (carminite: 1953) 8.BH.25    (IUPAC: dilithium strontium tetraluminium tetrahydro tetraphosphate)
PalladiniteQ (Y: 1837) 4.AB.30  [no] [no] (IUPAC: palladium oxide)
Palladium (element: 1803) 1.AF.10   
Palladoarsenide (IMA1973-005) 2.AC.25a    (IUPAC: dipalladium arsenide)
Palladobismutharsenide (IMA1975-017) 2.AC.25f    (IUPAC: dipalladium (arsenide,bismuthide))
Palladodymite (IMA1997-028) 2.AC.25c    (IUPAC: dipalladium arsenide)
Palladogermanide (barringerite: IMA2016-086) 1.BB.  [no] [no] (IUPAC: dipalladium germanide)
Palladosilicide (barringerite: IMA2014-080) 1.BB.  [no] [no] (IUPAC: dipalladium silicide)
Palladothallite (alloy: IMA2019-009a) 1.0  [no] [no] (IUPAC: tripaladium thallium alloy)
Palladseite (IMA1975-026) 2.BC.05    (IUPAC: heptadecapalladium pentadecaselenide)
Palmierite (palmierite: 1907) 7.AD.40    (IUPAC: dipotassium lead disulfate)
Palygorskite (palygorskite: 1862) 9.EE.20   
Pampaloite (IMA2017-096) 2.EA.40  [no] [no] (IUPAC: gold antimonide telluride)
Panasqueiraite (titanite: IMA1978-063) 8.BH.10    (IUPAC: calcium magnesium hydro phosphate)
Pandoraite 8.0
Pandoraite-Ba (IMA2018-024) 8.0  [no] [no]
Pandoraite-Ca (IMA2018-036) 8.0  [no] [no]
Panethite (IMA1966-035) 8.AC.65   
Panguite (IMA2010-057) 4.0  [no] [no]
Panichiite (IMA2008-005) 3.0   [no] (IUPAC: diammonium tin hexachloride)
Panskyite (IMA2020-039) 2.BC.  [no] [no]
Pansnerite (IMA2016-103) 8.0  [no] [no] (IUPAC: tripotassium trisodium hexa(iron(III),alumino) octaarsenate)
Panunzite (feldspathoid, nepheline: IMA1978-050) 9.FA.05    (IUPAC: tripotassium sodium tetra(aluminotetraoxosilicate))
Paolovite (tin alloy: IMA1972-025) 1.AG.20    (IUPAC: dipalladium stannide)
Papagoite (IMA1962 s.p.) 9.CE.05    (IUPAC: calcium copper aluminium hexaoxodisilicate trihydroxyl)
Paqueite (IMA2013-053) 9.B?.  [no] [no]
Para-alumohydrocalcite (alumohydrocalcite: IMA1976-027) 5.DB.05    (IUPAC: calcium dialuminium tetrahydro dicarbonate hexahydrate)
Paraberzeliite (alluaudite: IMA2018-001) 8.0  [no] [no] (NaCaCaMg2(AsO4)3)
Parabrandtite (fairfieldite: IMA1986-009) 8.CG.05    (IUPAC: dicalcium manganese(II) diarsenate dihydrate)
Parabutlerite (Y: 1938) 7.DC.10    (IUPAC: iron(III) hydro sulfate dihydrate)
Paracelsian (mineral) (danburite: 1905) 9.FA.40   
Paracoquimbite (Y: 1933) 7.CB.55    (IUPAC: diiron(III) trisulfate nonahydrate)
Paracostibite (löllingite: IMA1969-023) 2.EB.10e    (IUPAC: cobalt antimonide sulfide)
Paradamite (Y: 1956) 8.BB.35    (IUPAC: dizinc hydro arsenate)
Paradimorphite (IMA2021-101) 2.FA.  [no] [no]
Paradocrasite (semi-metal alloy: IMA1969-011) 1.CA.15    (IUPAC: diantimony di(antimony,arsenic) alloy)
Parádsasvárite (malachite: IMA2012-077) 5.BA.  [no] [no] (IUPAC: dizinc dihydro carbonate)
Paraershovite (IMA2009-025) 9.DF.15  [no] 
Parafiniukite (apatite: IMA2018-047) 8.0  [no] [no] (IUPAC: dicalcium trimanganese chloro triphosphate)
Parafransoletite (IMA1989-049) 8.CA.05    (IUPAC: tricalcium diberyllium diphosphate dihydroxophosphate tetrahydrate)
Parageorgbokiite (selenite: IMA2006-001) 4.JG.05    (IUPAC: pentacopper dichloro dioxodiselenite)
Paragersdorffite (gersdorffite-Pa3: 1982) 2.EB.25  [no] [no]
Paragonite (mica: IMA1998 s.p., 1843) 9.EC.15    (IUPAC: sodium dialuminium (aluminotrisilicate) decaoxy dihydroxyl)
Paraguanajuatite (tetradymite: 1949) 2.DC.05    (IUPAC: dibismuth triselenide)
Parahibbingite (IMA2020-038a) 4.0  [no] [no]
Parahopeite (Y: 1908) 8.CA.70    (IUPAC: trizinc diphosphate tetrahydrate)
Parakeldyshite (IMA1975-035) 9.BC.10    (IUPAC: disodium zirconium heptaoxodisilicate)
Parakuzmenkoite-Fe (labuntsovite: IMA2001-007) 9.CE.30g   [no]
Paralabuntsovite-Mg (labuntsovite: IMA2000-A) 9.CE.30f   [no]
Paralammerite (lammerite-β: IMA2009-002) 8.AB.30  [no]  (IUPAC: tricopper diarsenate)
Paralaurionite (Y: 1899) 3.DC.05    (IUPAC: lead hydro chloride)
Paralomonosovite (seidozerite, murmanite: IMA2014-J) 9.BE.  [no] [no]
Paralstonite (IMA1979-015) 5.AB.40    (IUPAC: barium calcium dicarbonate)
Paramarkeyite (IMA2021-024) 5.ED.  [no] [no]
Paramelaconite (Y: 1891) 4.AA.15    (IUPAC: dicopper(I) dicopper(II) trioxide)
Paramendozavilite (heteropolymolybdate: IMA1982-010) 7.GB.45   
Paramontroseite (ramsdellite: 1955) 4.DB.15a    (IUPAC: vanadium dioxide)
Paranatisite (IMA1990-016) 9.AG.40b    (IUPAC: disodium titanium oxo(tetraoxosilicate))
Paranatrolite (zeolitic tectosilicate: IMA1978-017) 9.GA.05   
Paraniite-(Y) (IMA1992-018) 7.GA.15   
Paraotwayite (IMA1984-045a) 7.BB.45   
Parapierrotite (IMA1974-059) 2.HC.05f    (IUPAC: thallium octasulfa pentaantimonide)
Pararaisaite (IMA2017-110) 7.0  [no] [no]
Pararammelsbergite (löllingite: 1940) 2.EB.10e    (IUPAC: nickel diarsenide)
Pararealgar (IMA1980-034) 2.FA.15b    (IUPAC: tetrarsenic tetrasulfide)
Pararobertsite (IMA1987-039) 8.DH.30    (IUPAC: dicalcium trimanganese(III) dioxotriphosphate trihydrate)
Pararsenolamprite (element: IMA1999-047) 1.CA.10   [no] (IUPAC: arsenic)
Parascandolaite (perovskite: IMA2013-092) 3.0  [no] [no] (IUPAC: potassium magnesium trifluoride)
Paraschachnerite (amalgam: IMA1971-056) 1.AD.15a    (IUPAC: trisilver dimercury amalgam)
ParaschoepiteQ (Y: 1947) 4.GA.05    Note: probably a mixture (metaschoepite, paulscherrerite and ianthinite).
Parascholzite (IMA1980-056) 8.CA.45    (IUPAC: calcium dizinc diphosphate dihydrate)
Parascorodite (IMA1996-061) 8.CD.15    (IUPAC: iron(III) arsenate dihydrate)
Parasibirskite (IMA1996-051) 6.BC.20    (IUPAC: dicalcium pentaoxodiborate monohydrate)
Parasterryite (madocite: IMA2010-033) 2.HC.40  [no] 
Parasymplesite (vivianite: 1954) 8.CE.40    (IUPAC: triiron(II) diarsenate octahydrate)
Paratacamite (atacamite) 3.DA.10c
Paratacamite (1906) 3.DA.10c    (IUPAC: tricopper(II) (copper,zinc) hexahydro dichloride)
Paratacamite-(Mg) (IMA2013-014) 3.DA.10c  [no] [no] (IUPAC: tricopper (magnesium,copper) hexahydro dichloride)
Paratacamite-(Ni) (IMA2013-013) 3.DA.10c  [no] [no] (IUPAC: tricopper (nickel,copper) hexahydro dichloride)
Paratellurite (rutile: IMA1962 s.p.) 4.DE.25    (IUPAC: tellurium dioxide)
Paratimroseite (tellurium oxysalt: IMA2009-065) 4.0  [no] [no] (IUPAC: dilead tetracopper di(tellurium hexaoxide) diwater)
Paratobermorite (tobermorite: IMA2020-100) 9.DG.  [no] [no]
Paratooite-(La) (IMA2005-020) 5.AD.20    (IUPAC: hexa(lanthanum,calcium,sodium,strontium) copper octacarbonate)
Paratsepinite (labuntsovite) 9.CE.30b
Paratsepinite-Ba (IMA2002-006) 9.CE.30b   [no]
Paratsepinite-Na (IMA2003-008) 9.CE.30b   [no]
Paraumbite (IMA1982-007) 9.DG.25     (IUPAC: tripotassium dizirconum hydrogen di(nonaoxotrisilicate) trihydrate)
Parauranophane (Y: 1935) 9.AK.15   
Paravauxite (laueite, laueite: 1922) 8.DC.30     (IUPAC: iron(II) dialuminium dihydro diphosphate octahydrate)
Paravinogradovite (IMA2002-033) 9.DB.25   [no]
Parawulffite (IMA2013-036) 7.0  [no] [no]  (IUPAC: pentapotassium trisodium octacopper tetraoxo octasulfate)
Pargasite [Ca-amphibole: IMA2012 s.p., IMA1997 s.p., 1815] 9.DE.15   
Parisite 5.BD.20b (IUPAC: calcium di(REE) difluoro tricarbonate)
Parisite-(Ce) (IMA1987 s.p., 1845) 5.BD.20b   
Parisite-(La) (IMA2016-031) 5.BD.20b  [no] [no]
Parisite-(Nd)N (Y: 1988) 5.BD.20b   
Parkerite (Y: 1937) 2.BE.20   
Parkinsonite (asisite: IMA1991-030) 3.DB.40    (IUPAC: heptalead molybdenum nonaoxide dichloride)
Parnauite (IMA1978-014) 8.DF.35    (IUPAC: nonacopper decahydro diarsenate sulfate heptahydrate)
Parsettensite (stilpnomelane: 1923) 9.EG.40   
Parsonsite (Y: 1923) 8.EA.10    (IUPAC: dilead uranyl diphosphate)
Parthéite (zeolitic tectosilicate: IMA1978-026) 9.GB.35   
Parwanite (IMA1986-036a) 8.DO.40   [no]
Parwelite (IMA1966-023) 8.BD.15   
Pašavaite (IMA2007-059) 2.BE.30    (IUPAC: tripalladium dilead ditelluride)
Pascoite (pascoite: 1914) 4.HC.05   
Paseroite (crichtonite: IMA2011-069) 4.0  [no] 
Patrónite (IMA2007 s.p., 1906) 2.EC.10    (IUPAC: vanadium tetrasulfide)
Pattersonite (IMA2005-049) 8.BL.25    (IUPAC: lead triiron pentahydro diphosphate monohydrate)
Patynite (IMA2019-018) 9.0  [no] [no]
Pauflerite (IMA2005-004) 7.BB.55   [no] (IUPAC: vanadium oxosulfate)
Pauladamsite (IMA2015-005) 7.0  [no] [no] (IUPAC: tetracopper tetrahydro selenite sulfate dihydrate)
Paulgrothite (IMA2021-004)  [no] [no]
Paulingite (zeolitic tectosilicate) 9.GC.35
Paulingite-Ca (IMA1997 s.p., 1997) 9.GC.35   [no]
Paulingite-K (IMA1997 s.p., 1960) 9.GC.35   
Paulkellerite (IMA1987-031) 8.BM.10    (IUPAC: dibismuth(III) iron(III) dihydro dioxophosphate)
Paulkerrite (IMA1983-014) 8.DH.35    (IUPAC: potassium dimagnesium titanium diiron(III) trihydro tetraphosphate pentadecahydrate)
Paulmooreite (IMA1978-004) 4.JA.50    (IUPAC: dilead diarsenic(III) pentaoxide)
Pauloabibite (corundum: IMA2012-090) 4.0  [no] [no] (IUPAC: sodium niobium trioxide)
Paulscherrerite (IMA2008-022) 4.GA.20  [no] [no] (IUPAC: uranyl dihydroxide)
Pautovite (cubanite: IMA2004-005) 2.FB.20    (IUPAC: caesium diiron trisulfide)
Pavlovskyite (IMA2010-063) 9.B?.  [no] [no] (IUPAC: octacalcium di(tetraoxosilicate) decaoxotrisilicate)
Pavonite (pavonite: 1954) 2.JA.05a    (IUPAC: silver tribismuth pentasulfide)
Paxite (arsenopyrite: IMA1967 s.p., 1961) 2.EB.15c    (IUPAC: copper diarsenide)

Pe – Ph 
Pearceite (pearceite-polybasite: IMA2006 s.p., 1833 Rd) 2.GB.15   
Peatite-(Y) (IMA2009-020) 8.0  [no] 
Pecoraite (serpentine: IMA1969-005) 9.ED.15   
Pectolite (pectolite: 1828) 9.DG.05   
Peisleyite (IMA1981-053) 8.DO.15   
Pekoite (meneghinite: IMA1975-014) 2.HB.05a    (CuPbBi11S18)
Pekovite (danburite: IMA2003-035) 9.FA.65    (IUPAC: strontium octaoxodiborodisilicate)
Péligotite (IMA2015-088) 7.0  [no] [no] (IUPAC: hexasodium uranyl tetrasulfate tetrawater)
Pellouxite (IMA2001-033) 2.JB.35d   
Pellyite (IMA1970-035) 9.DO.10   
Penberthycroftite (IMA2015-025) 8.0  [no] [no] (IUPAC: [hexaluminium nonahydro triarsenate pentawater] octahydrate)
Pendevilleite-(Y) (IMA2022-054) 5.ED.  [no] [no]
Penfieldite (Y: 1892) 3.DC.15    (IUPAC: dilead hydro trichloride)
Penikisite (bjarebyite: IMA1976-023) 8.BH.20    (IUPAC: barium dimagnesium dialuminium trihydro triphosphate)
Penkvilksite (IMA1973-016) 9.EA.60    (IUPAC: disodium undecaoxotitanotetrasilicate dihydrate)
Pennantite (chlorite: 1946) 9.EC.55   
Penobsquisite (IMA1995-014) 6.GB.10   
Penriceite (IMA2021-068)  [no] [no]
Penroseite (pyrite: 1926) 2.EB.05a    (IUPAC: (nickel,cobalt,copper) diselenide)
Pentagonite (IMA1971-039) 9.EA.55   
Pentahydrite (chalcanthite: 1951) 7.CB.20    (IUPAC: magnesium sulfate pentahydrate)
Pentahydroborite (IMA1967 s.p., 1961) 6.BB.10    (IUPAC: calcium hexahydro oxodiborate dihydrate)
Pentlandite (pentlandite: 1856) 2.BB.15    (IUPAC: nona(nickel,iron) octasulfide)
Penzhinite (IMA1982-027) 2.BA.75    (IUPAC: tetra(silver,copper) gold tetra(sulfide,selenide))
Peprossiite-(Ce) (IMA1990-002 Rd) 6.CA.45   
Perbøeite (gatelite) 9.BG. (IUPAC: (calcium triREE) (trialuminium iron(II)) heptaoxodisilicate tri(tetraoxysilicate) oxy dihydroxyl)
Perbøeite-(Ce) (IMA2011-055) 9.BG.  [no] [no]
Perbøeite-(La) (IMA2018-116) 9.BG.  [no] [no]
Percleveite (IUPAC: diREE heptaoxodisilicate)
Percleveite-(Ce) (IMA2002-023) 9.BC.35   [no]
Percleveite-(La) (IMA2019-037) 9.BC.35  [no] [no]
Peretaite (IMA1979-068) 7.DF.45    (IUPAC: calcium tetraantimony(III) dihydro tetraoxodisulfate dihydrate)
Perettiite-(Y) (IMA2014-109) 6.0  [no] [no]
Perhamite (IMA1975-019) 8.DO.20   
Periclase (rocksalt, periclase: 1841) 4.AB.25    (IUPAC: magnesium(II) oxide)
Perite (nadorite: IMA1962 s.p.) 3.DC.30    (IUPAC: lead bismuth dioxochloride)
Perlialite (zeolitic tectosilicate: IMA1982-032) 9.GC.25   
Perloffite (bjarebyite: IMA1976-002) 8.BH.20    (IUPAC: barium dimanganese(II) diron(III) trihydro triphosphate)
Permingeatite (stannite: IMA1971-003) 2.KA.10    (IUPAC: tricopper antimonide tetraselenide)
Perovskite (oxide perovskite: 1839) 4.CC.30    (IUPAC: calcium titanium trioxide)
Perraultite (seidozerite, bafertisite: IMA1984-033) 9.BE.67    (IUPAC: barium sodium tetramanganese dititanium heptaoxodisilicate dioxy dihydroxyl fluoride)
Perrierite (chevkinite) 9.BE.70
Perrierite-(Ce) (IMA1987 s.p., 1950) 9.BE.70   
Perrierite-(La) (IMA2010-089) 9.BE.70  [no] 
Perroudite (IMA1986-035) 2.FC.20c    (IUPAC: tetrasilver pentamercury di(iodo,bromo) dichloro pentasulfide)
Perryite (silicide: IMA1968 s.p., 1965) 1.BB.10    (IUPAC: octa(nickel,iron) tri(silicide,phosphide))
Pertlikite (voltaite: IMA2005-055) 7.CC.25   [no]
Pertoldite (IMA2021-074) 4.DE.  [no] [no]
Pertsevite 6.AB.75 (IUPAC: dimagnesium trioxoborate (monovalent anion))
Pertsevite-(F) (IMA2002-030) 6.AB.75   [no]
Pertsevite-(OH) (IMA2008-060) 6.AB.75  [no] [no]
Petalite (Y: 1800) 9.EF.05    (IUPAC: lithium aluminium decaoxotetrasilicate)
Petarasite (IMA1979-063) 9.CJ.40   
Petedunnite (pyroxene: IMA1983-073) 9.DA.15    (IUPAC: calcium zinc hexaoxodisilicate)
Peterandresenite (polyoxometalate: IMA2012-084) 4.0  [no] [no]
Peterbaylissite (IMA1993-041) 5.DC.25    (IUPAC: trimercury hydroxo carbonate dihydrate)
Petermegawite (IMA2021-079) 4.JJ.  [no] [no]
Petersenite-(Ce) (IMA1992-048) 5.AD.15    (IUPAC: tetrasodium dicerium pentacarbonate)
Petersite 8.DL.15 (IUPAC: hexacopper (REE) hexahydro triphosphate trihydrate)
Petersite-(Ce) (IMA2014-002) 8.DL.15  [no] [no]
Petersite-(La) (IMA2017-089) 8.DL.15  [no] [no]
Petersite-(Y) (IMA1981-064) 8.DL.15   
Petewilliamsite (IMA2002-059) 8.FA.25   
Petitjeanite (IMA1992-013) 8.BO.10    (IUPAC: tribismuth hydro oxodiphosphate)
Petříčekite (marcasite: IMA2015-111) 2.0  [no] [no] (IUPAC: copper diselenide)
Petrovicite (IMA1975-010) 2.LB.40    (IUPAC: tricopper mercury lead bismuth pentaselenide)
Petrovite (IMA2018-149b) 7.0  [no] [no]
Petrovskaite (IMA1983-079) 2.BA.75    (IUPAC: gold silver sulfide)
Petrukite (wurtzite: IMA1985-052) 2.KA.05   
Petscheckite (IMA1975-038) 4.DH.35    (IUPAC: uranium(IV) iron(II) diniobium octaoxide)
Petterdite (dundasite: IMA1999-034) 5.DB.10    (IUPAC: lead dichromium tetrahydro dicarbonate monohydrate)
Petzite (Y: 1845) 2.BA.75    (IUPAC: trisilver gold ditelluride)
Pezzottaite (distorted beryl: IMA2003-022) 9.CJ.60   
Pharmacoalumite (pharmacosiderite: IMA1980-002) 8.DK.12    (IUPAC: dipotassium octaluminium octahydro hexarsenate tridecahydrate)
Pharmacolite (gypsum: 1800) 8.CJ.50    (IUPAC: calcium hydroxoarsenate dihydrate)
Pharmacosiderite (pharmacosiderite: 1786) 8.DK.10   
Pharmazincite (feldspathoid, nepheline: IMA2014-015) 8.0  [no] [no] (IUPAC: potassium zinc arsenate)
Phaunouxite (IMA1980-062) 8.CJ.40    (IUPAC: tricalcium diarsenate undecahydrate)
Phenakite (phenakite: 1834) 9.AA.05    (IUPAC: diberyllium tetraoxosilicate)
Philipsbornite (alunite, crandallite: IMA1981-029) 8.BL.10    (IUPAC: lead trialuminium arsenate hexahydro hydroxoarsenate)
Philipsburgite (IMA1984-029) 8.DA.35   
Phillipsite (zeolitic tectosilicate) 9.GC.10
Phillipsite-Ca (IMA1997 s.p., 1972) 9.GC.10   [no]
Phillipsite-K (IMA1997 s.p., 1962) 9.GC.10   
Phillipsite-Na (IMA1997 s.p., 1825) 9.GC.10   [no]
Philolithite (IMA1996-020) 5.BF.35   
Philoxenite (IMA2015-108) 7.0  [no] [no]
Philrothite (sartorite: IMA2013-066) 2.0  [no]  (IUPAC: thallium pentasulfa triarsenide)
Phlogopite (mica: 1841) 9.EC.20    (IUPAC: potassium trimagnesium (aluminodecaoxotrisilicate) dihydroxyl)
Phoenicochroite (IMA1980 s.p., 1833) 7.FB.05    (IUPAC: dilead oxochromate)
Phosgenite (Y: 1841) 5.BE.20    (IUPAC: dilead dichloro carbonate)
Phosinaite-(Ce) (IMA1973-058) 9.CF.15    (IUPAC: tridecasodium calcium cerium tetra(trioxosilicate) tetraphosphate)
Phosphammite (Y: 1852) 8.AD.20    (IUPAC: diammonium hydroxophosphate)
Phosphocyclite 8.FA.
Phosphocyclite-(Fe) (IMA2020-087) 8.FA.  [no] [no]
Phosphocyclite-(Ni) (IMA2020-088) 8.FA.  [no] [no]
Phosphoellenbergerite (ellenbergerite: IMA1994-006) 8.BB.55   
Phosphoferrite (reddingite: IMA1980 s.p., 1920 Rd) 8.CC.05    (IUPAC: triiron(II) diphosphate trihydrate)
Phosphofibrite (phosphofibrite: IMA1982-082) 8.DJ.20   
Phosphogartrellite (tsumcorite: IMA1996-035) 8.CG.20    (IUPAC: lead copper iron(III) di(hydro,water) diphosphate)
Phosphohedyphane (apatite: IMA2005-026) 8.BN.05   [no] (IUPAC: dicalcium trilead chloro triphosphate)
Phosphoinnelite (IMA2005-022) 9.BE.40    (IUPAC: trisodium tetrabarium trititanium di(heptaoxodisilicate) di(phosphate,sulfate) dioxofluorine)
Phosphophyllite (Y: 1920) 8.CA.40    (IUPAC: dizinc iron(II) diphosphate tetrahydrate)
Phosphorrösslerite (Y: 1939) 8.CE.20    (IUPAC: magnesium hydroxophosphate heptahydrate)
Phosphosiderite (metavariscite: IMA1967 s.p., 1890) 8.CD.05    (IUPAC: iron(III) phosphate dihydrate)
Phosphovanadylite 8.DM.20
Phosphovanadylite-Ba (2013, IMA1996-037 Rd) 8.DM.20    
Phosphovanadylite-Ca (IMA2011-101) 8.DM.20  [no] [no] 
Phosphowalpurgite (IMA2001-062) 8.EA.05    (IUPAC: uranyl tetrabismuth tetraoxodiphosphate dihydrate)
Phosphuranylite (phosphuranylite: 1879) 8.EC.10    (IUPAC: potassium calcium trihydronium heptauranyl tetraoxotetraphosphate octahydrate)
Phoxite (IMA2018-009) 10.0  [no] [no]
Phuralumite (phosphuranylite: IMA1978-044) 8.EC.05    (IUPAC: dialuminium triuranyl hexahydro diphosphate decahydrate)
Phurcalite (phosphuranylite: 1977–040) 8.EC.35    (IUPAC: dicalcium triuranyl dioxodiphosphate heptahydrate)
PhylloretineQ (Y: 1839) 10.BA.35  [no] [no]
Phyllotungstite (IMA1984-018) 7.GB.20

Pi – Pl 
Picaite (IMA2018-022) 8.0  [no] [no] (IUPAC: sodium calcium hydroxoarsenate dihydroxoarsenate)
Piccoliite (carminite: IMA2017-016) 8.0  [no] [no] (IUPAC: sodium calcium dimanganese(III) oxodehydro diarsenate)
Pickeringite (halotrichite: 1844) 7.CB.85    (IUPAC: magnesium dialuminium tetrasulfate docosahydrate)
Picotpaulite (cubanite: IMA1970-031) 2.CB.60    (IUPAC: thallium diiron trisulfide)
Picromerite (picromerite: IMA1982 s.p., 1955) 7.CC.60    (IUPAC: dipotassium magnesium disulfate hexahydrate)
Picropharmacolite (Y: 1819) 8.CH.15    (IUPAC: tetracalcium magnesium di(hydroxoarsenate) diarsenate undecahydrate)
Pieczkaite (apatite: IMA2014-005) 8.0  [no] [no] (IUPAC: pentamanganese chloro triphosphate)
Piemontite (epidote, epidote: IMA1962 s.p., 1853) 9.BG.05    (IUPAC: dicalcium (dialuminium manganese(III)) heptaoxodisilicate tetraoxosilicate oxyhydroxyl)
Piemontite (epidote, clinozoisite) 9.BG. (IUPAC: calcium [metal] (dialuminiium manganese(III)) heptaoxodisilicate tetraoxosilicate oxyhydroxyl)
Piemontite-(Pb) (IMA2011-087) 9.BG.  [no] 
Piemontite-(Sr) (IMA1989-031) 9.BG.   
Piergorite-(Ce) (IMA2005-008) 9.DL.10   [no]
Pierrotite (sartorite: IMA1969-036) 2.HC.05f    
Pigeonite (pyroxene: IMA1988 s.p., 1900) 9.DA.10     (IUPAC: di(magnesium,iron,calcium) hexaoxodisilicate)
PigotiteQ (Y: 1840) 10.AC.15  [no] [no]
Pilawite-(Y) (carminite: IMA2013-125) 9.0  [no] [no]  (IUPAC: dicalcium diyttrium tetraluminium tetra(tetraoxosilicate) dioxydihydroxyl)
Pillaite (IMA1997-042) 2.JB.35c   
Pilsenite (tetradymite: IMA1982 s.p., 1853 Rd) 2.DC.05     (IUPAC: tetrabismuth tritelluride)
(Pimelite: a nickel-dominant smectite (smectite group: saponite group and montmorillonite group))
Pinakiolite (Y: 1890) 6.AB.35   
Pinalite (IMA1988-025) 3.DC.55     (IUPAC: trilead oxochloro tungstate)
Pinchite (IMA1973-052) 3.DD.25     (IUPAC: pentamercury tetraoxodichloride)
Pingguite (tellurite: IMA1993-019) 4.JL.20     (IUPAC: hexabismuth tridecaoxoditellurate(IV))
Pinnoite (Y: 1884) 6.BB.05     (IUPAC: magnesium [hexahydro oxodiborate])
PintadoiteQ (Y: 1914) 8.FC.15     (IUPAC: dicalcium heptaoxodivanadate(V) nonahydrate)
Piretite (selenite: IMA1996-002) 4.JJ.15     (IUPAC: calcium triuranyl tetrahydro diselenite tetrahydrate)
Pirquitasite (stannite: IMA1980-091) 2.CB.15a    (IUPAC: disilver zinc tetrasulfa stannide)
Pirssonite (Y: 1896) 5.CB.30     (IUPAC: disodium calcium dicarbonate dihydrate)
Písekite-(Y)Q (Y: 1923) 4.00.  [no] [no] Note: synonym of monazite-(Y) (not approved).
Pitiglianoite (cancrinite: IMA1990-012) 9.FB.05   
PitticiteQ (Y: 1808) 8.DB.05    Note: "generic name for amorphous, gel-like, ferric iron arsenate minerals of varying chemical composition" (P. J. Dunn, 1982).
Pittongite (IMA2005-034a) 4.DH.45   
Piypite (IMA1982-097) 7.BC.40    (IUPAC: tetrapotassium tetracopper dioxotetrasulfate · (sodium,copper)chloride)
Pizgrischite (cuprobismutite: IMA2001-002) 2.JA.10d   [no]
PlagioniteI (plagionite: 1833) 2.HC.10b     (Pb5Sb8S17)
Plancheite (IMA1967 s.p., 1908 Rd) 9.DB.35     (IUPAC: octacopper di(undecaoxotetrasilicate) tetrahydroxyl monohydrate)
Planerite (turquoise: IMA1998 s.p., 1862 Rd) 8.DD.15     (IUPAC: hexaaluminium octahydro diphosphate di(hydroxophosphate) tetrahydrate)
Plášilite (IMA2014-021) 7.0  [no] [no]  (IUPAC: sodium uranyl hydro sulfate dihydrate)
Platarsite (pyrite: IMA1976-050) 2.EB.25     (IUPAC: platinum sulfa arsenide)
Platinum (element: 1750) 1.AF.10   
Plattnerite (rutile: 1845) 4.DB.05     (IUPAC: lead(IV) oxide)
Plavnoite (zippeite: IMA2015-059) 7.0  [no] [no]  (K0.8Mn0.6[(UO2)2O2(SO4)]·3.5H2O)
Playfairite (madocite: IMA1966-019) 2.LB.30    
Plimerite (rockbridgeite: IMA2008-013) 8.BC.10     (IUPAC: zinc tetrairon(III) pentahydro triphosphate)
Pliniusite (apatite: IMA2018-031) 8.BN.05  [no] [no]
Plombièrite (tobermorite: 1858) 9.DG.08   
Plumboagardite (mixite: IMA2003-031a) 8.DL.15   
Plumboferrite (magnetoplumbite: 1881) 4.CC.45   
Plumbogummite (alunite, crandallite: IMA1999 s.p., 1819 Rd) 8.BL.10    (IUPAC: lead trialuminium hexahydro phosphate hydroxophosphate)
Plumbojarosite (alunite, alunite: IMA1987 s.p., 1902 Rd) 7.BC.10    (IUPAC: lead hexairon(III) dodecahydro tetrasulfate)
Plumbonacrite (Y: 1889 Rd) 5.BE.15    (IUPAC: pentalead oxodihydro tricarbonate)
Plumbopalladinite (alloy: IMA1970-020) 1.AG.25    (IUPAC: tripalladium dilead alloy)
Plumboperloffite (bjarebyite: IMA2020-007) 8.0  [no] [no]
Plumbopharmacosiderite (pharmacosiderite: IMA2016-109) 8.0  [no] [no] (IUPAC: lead octairon(III) octahydro hexarsenate decahydrate)
Plumbophyllite (IMA2008-025) 9.EA.85   [no] (IUPAC: dilead decaoxotetrasilicate monohydrate)
Plumboselite (IMA2010-028) 4.0  [no]   (IUPAC: trilead dioxoselenite)
Plumbotellurite (tellurite: IMA1980-102) 4.JK.55     (IUPAC: lead tellurate(IV))
Plumbotsumite (IMA1979-049) 9.HH.20     (IUPAC: pentalead octaoxotetrasilicate decahydroxyl)
PlumositeQ (Y: 1845) 2.0  [no] [no] (IUPAC: dilead pentasulfa diantimonide) Note: old specimens are various Pb–Sb sulfosalts with a hair-like (feather ore) habit.  Many times boulangerite, but sometimes jamesonite, zinkenite, as well.

Po – Py 
Podlesnoite (IMA2006-033) 5.BC.15   [no]  (IUPAC: barium dicalcium difluoro dicarbonate)
Poellmannite (hydrotalcite: IMA2021-109) 7.DF.  [no] [no]
Pohlite (IMA2022-043) 4.KB.  [no] [no]
Poitevinite (IMA1963-010) 7.CB.05    (IUPAC: copper sulfate monohydrate)
Pokhodyashinite (sulfosalt: IMA2019-130) 2.0  [no] [no]
Pokrovskite (malachite: IMA1982-054) 5.BA.10    (IUPAC: dimagnesium dihydro carbonate)
Poirierite (IMA2018-026b) 9.A  [no] [no] (IUPAC: dimagnesium tetraoxysilicate)
Polarite (IMA1969-032) 2.AC.40   
Poldervaartite (IMA1992-012) 9.AF.90    (IUPAC: calcium (calcium,manganese) (hydrotrioxosilicate) hydroxyl)
Polekhovskyite (phosphide: IMA2018-147) 1.0  [no] [no] 
Polezhaevaite-(Ce) (gagarinite: IMA2009-015) 3.AB.35  [no] [no] (IUPAC: sodium strontium cerium hexafluoride)
Polhemusite (IMA1972-017) 2.CB.05c    (IUPAC: (zinc,mercury) sulfide)
Polkanovite (IMA1997-030) 2.AC.30    (IUPAC: dodecarhenium heptarsenide)
Polkovicite (1974-037) 2.CB.35a   
Polloneite (sartorite: IMA2014-093) 2.0  [no] [no] (AgPb46As26Sb23S120)
Pollucite (zeolitic tectosilicate: IMA1997 s.p., 1846) 9.GB.05    (IUPAC: caesium (aluminodisilicate) hexaoxide (n)hydrate)
Polyakovite-(Ce) (chevkinite: IMA1998-029) 9.BE.70   [no] (IUPAC: tetra(cerium,calcium) magnesium dichromium di(titanium,niobium) docosaoxotetrasilicate)
Polyarsite (IMA2019-058) 8.0  [no] [no]
Polybasite (pearceite-polybasite: IMA2006 s.p., 1829 Rd) 2.GB.15   
Polycrase-(Y) (columbite: IMA1987 s.p., 1844) 4.DG.05    (IUPAC: yttrium di(titanium,niobium) hexa(oxo,hydro))
Polydymite (spinel, linnaeite: 1876) 2.DA.05    (IUPAC: nickel(II) dinickel(III) tetrasulfide)
Polyhalite (Y: 1817) 7.CC.65    (IUPAC: dipotassium dicalcium magnesium tetrasulfate dihydrate)
Polylithionite (mica: IMA1998 s.p., 1884) 9.EC.20    (IUPAC: potassium dilithium aluminium decaoxotetrasilicate difluorine)
Polyphite (seidozerite, murmanite: IMA1990-025) 9.BE.47   
Pomite (heteropolyvanadate: IMA2021-063) 4.H0.  [no] [no]
Ponomarevite (IMA1986-040) 3.DA.35    (IUPAC: tetrapotassium tetracopper oxodecachloride)
Popovite (IMA2013-060) 8.  [no] [no]  (IUPAC: pentacopper dioxodiarsenate)
Poppiite (IMA2005-018) 9.BG.20   [no] 
Popugaevaite (IMA2019-115) 6.CE.  [no] [no]
Portlandite (brucite: 1933) 4.FE.05     (IUPAC: calcium dihydroxide)
Pošepnýite (tetrahedrite: IMA2018-121a) 2.0  [no] [no]
Posnjakite (IMA1967-001) 7.DD.10     (IUPAC: tetracopper hexahydro sulfate monohydrate)
Postite (decavanadate: IMA2011-060) 4.0  [no] 
Potarite (amalgam: 1928) 1.AD.25     (IUPAC: palladium mercury amalgam)
Potassic-arfvedsonite [Na-amphibole: IMA2012 s.p., potassicarfvedsonite (IMA2003-043)] 9.DE.25    [no]
Potassiccarpholite (carpholite: IMA002-064) 9.DB.05   [no]
Potassic-chloro-hastingsite [Ca-amphibole: IMA2012 s.p., chloro-potassichastingsite (IMA2005-007)] 9.DE.15   [no]
Potassic-chloro-pargasite [Ca-amphibole: IMA2012 s.p., potassic-chloropargasite (IMA2001-036)] 9.DE.15  [no] [no]
Potassic-ferri-leakeite [Na-amphibole: IMA2012 s.p., potassicleakeite (IMA2001-049)] 9.DE.25   [no]
Potassic-ferro-ferri-sadanagaite [Ca-amphibole: IMA2012 s.p., potassic-ferrisadanagaite (IMA1997-035)] 9.DE.15   [no]
Potassic-ferro-ferri-taramite [Na-Ca-amphibole: IMA2012 s.p., mboziite (IMA1964-003)] 9.DE.20   [no]
Potassic-ferro-pargasite [Ca-amphibole: IMA2012 s.p., potassic-ferropargasite (IMA2007-053)] 9.DE.15   [no]
Potassic-ferro-sadanagaite [Ca-amphibole: IMA2012 s.p., potassic-aluminosadanagaite (IMA1980-027)] 9.DE.15   [no]
Potassic-ferro-taramite [Na-Ca-amphibole: IMA2012 s.p., potassic-aluminotaramite (IMA2007-015)] 9.D  [no] [no]
Potassic-fluoro-hastingsite [Ca-amphibole: IMA2012 s.p., fluoro-potassichastingsite (IMA2005-006)] 9.DE.15  [no] 
Potassic-fluoro-pargasite [Ca-amphibole: IMA2012 s.p., fluoro-potassic-pargasite (IMA2009-091)] 9.DE.10  [no]  
Potassic-fluoro-richterite [Na-Ca-amphibole: IMA2012 s.p., fluoro-potassicrichterite (IMA2004 s.p.), potassium-fluorrichterite (IMA1986-046)] 9.DE.20  [no] [no]
Potassic-hastingsite [Ca-amphibole: IMA2018-160] 9.D  [no] 
Potassic-jeanlouisite [amphibole: IMA2018-050] 9.DE.  [no] [no]
Potassic-magnesio-arfvedsonite [Na-amphibole: IMA2016-083] 9.DE.25  [no] [no]
Potassic-magnesio-fluoro-arfvedsonite [Na-amphibole: IMA2012 s.p., fluoro-potassic-magnesio-arfvedsonite (IMA2006 s.p.), potassium fluoro-magnesio-arfvedsonite (IMA1985-023)] 9.DE.25  [no] [no]
Potassic-magnesio-hastingsite [Ca-amphibole: IMA2012 s.p., potassic-magnesiohastingsite (IMA2004-027b)] 9.DE.15   [no]
Potassic-mangani-leakeite [Na-amphibole: IMA2012 s.p., kornite (IMA1992-032)] 9.DE.25   [no]
Potassic-pargasite [Ca-amphibole: IMA2012 s.p., potassicpargasite (IMA1994-046)] 9.DE.15   [no]
Potassic-richterite (Na-Ca-amphibole: IMA2017-102) 9.D  [no] [no]
Potassic-sadanagaite [Ca-amphibole: IMA2012 s.p., potassic-magnesiosadanagaite (IMA2003 s.p.), magnesiosadanagaite (2004), magnesio-sadanagaite (IMA1982-102)] 9.D  [no] [no]
Pottsite (IMA1986-045) 8.CG.25    (IUPAC: (trilead bismuth) bismuth tetravanadate monohydrate)
Poubaite (aleksite: IMA1975-015) 2.GC.40c    (IUPAC: lead dibismuthide tetra(selenide,telluride,sulfide))
Poudretteite (milarite: IMA1986-028) 9.CM.05    (IUPAC: potassium disodium (triborododecasilicate) triacontaoxy)
Poughite (tellurite: IMA1966-048) 4.JN.10    (IUPAC: diron(III) di(trioxotellurate(IV)) sulfate trihydrate)
Povondraite (tourmaline: IMA1990-E) 9.CK.05   
Powellite (scheelite: 1891) 7.GA.05    (IUPAC: calcium tetraoxomolybdate)
Poyarkovite (IMA1980-099) 3.DD.10    (IUPAC: tri(dimercury) dioxodichloride)
Pradetite (lindackerite: IMA2006-D, IMA1991-046 Rd) 8.CE.30  [no] [no] (IUPAC: cobalt tetracopper diarsenate di(hydroxoarsenate) nonahydrate)
Prachařite (IMA2018-081) 4.0  [no] [no]
Prehnite (Y: 1789) 9.DP.20    (IUPAC: dicalcium aluminium (aluminotrisilicate) decaoxy dihydroxyl)
Preisingerite (IMA1981-016) 8.BO.10    (IUPAC: tribismuth hydro oxodiarsenate)
Preiswerkite (mica: IMA1979-008) 9.EC.20    (IUPAC: sodium aluminium dimagnesium (dialuminodisilicate) decaoxy dihydroxyl)
Preobrazhenskite (Y: 1956) 6.GB.15    (IUPAC: trimagnesium nonahydro pentaoxoundecaborate)
Pretulite (zircon: IMA1996-024) 8.AD.35    (IUPAC: scandium phosphate)
Prewittite (selenite: IMA2002-041) 4.JG.   [no]
Příbramite (chalcostibite: IMA2015-127) 2.0  [no] [no] (IUPAC: copper antimony diselenide)
Priceite (Y: 1873) 6.EB.25    (IUPAC: dicalcium pentahydro heptaoxopentaborate monohydrate)
Priderite (hollandite, coronadite: 1951) 4.DK.05b    (IUPAC: potassium (heptatitanium iron(III) hexadecaoxide)
Princivalleite (tourmaline: IMA2020-056) 9.CK.  [no] [no]
Pringleite (IMA1992-010) 6.GD.05   
Priscillagrewite-(Y) (garnet: IMA2020-002) 4.0  [no] [no] (IUPAC: (dicalcium yttrium) dizirconium tri(aluminium tetraoxide))
Prismatine (IMA1996 s.p., 1886 Rd) 9.BJ.50   [no]
Probertite (Y: 1929) 6.EB.15    (IUPAC: sodium calcium tetrahydro heptaoxopentaborate trihydrate)
Proshchenkoite-(Y) (okanoganite: IMA2008-007) 9.AJ.35   [no]
Prosopite (Y: 1853) 3.CD.10    (IUPAC: calcium alumino octa(fluoride,hydro))
Prosperite (IMA1978-028) 8.CA.60    (IUPAC: dicalcium tetrazinc tetrarsenate monohydrate)
Protasite (IMA1984-001) 4.GB.10    (IUPAC: barium triuranyl dihydro trioxide trihydrate)
Proto-anthophyllite [Mg-Fe-Mn-amphibole: IMA2012 s.p., protoanthophyllite (IMA2001-065)] 9.DD.05   [no]
Protocaseyite (decavanadate: IMA2020-090)  [no] [no]
Protochabournéite (chabournéite: IMA2011-054) 2.0  [no] [no]
Protoenstatite (pyroxene: IMA2016-117) 9.DA.  [no] [no] (IUPAC: dimagnesium hexaoxodisilicate)
Proto-ferro-anthophyllite [Mg-Fe-Mn-amphibole: IMA2012 s.p., protoferro-anthophyllite (IMA1986-006)] 9.DD.05   [no]
Proto-ferro-suenoite [Mg-Fe-Mn-amphibole: IMA2013 s.p., proto-mangano-ferro-anthophyllite (IMA1986-007)] 9.DD.05  [no] [no]
Proudite (IMA1975-028) 2.JB.25d    (Cu2Pb16Bi20(S,Se)47)
Proustite (Y: 1832) 2.GA.05    (IUPAC: trisilver sulfarsenite)
Proxidecagonite (IMA2018-038) 1.0  [no] [no]
PrzhevalskiteQ (Y: 1956) 8.EB.10    (IUPAC: lead diuranyl diphosphate tetrahydrate)
Pseudoboleite (IMA2007 s.p., 1895) 3.DB.10   
Pseudobrookite (IMA1988 s.p., 1878 Rd) 4.CB.15    (IUPAC: (diiron(III) titanium) pentaoxide)
PseudocotunniteQ (Y: 1873) 3.DC.90    (IUPAC: dipotassium lead tetrachloride (?))
Pseudodickthomssenite (sodalite: IMA2021-027)  [no] [no]
Pseudograndreefite (IMA1988-017) 7.BD.65    (IUPAC: hexalead sulfate decafluoride)
Pseudojohannite (IMA2000-019) 7.EC.20   [no] (IUPAC: tricopper dihydro [tetrauranyl tetraoxodisulfate] dodecahydrate)
Pseudolaueite (stewartite, laueite: 1956) 8.DC.30    (IUPAC: manganese(II) diiron(III) dihydro diphosphate octahydrate)
Pseudolyonsite (howardevansite: IMA2009-062) 8.AB.35  [no]  (IUPAC: tricopper divanadate)
Pseudomalachite (Y: 1813) 8.BD.05    (IUPAC: pentacopper tetrahydro diphosphate)
Pseudomarkeyite (IMA2018-114) 5.0  [no] [no] (IUPAC: octacalcium tetrauranyl dodecacarbonate henicosahydrate)
Pseudomeisserite-(NH4) (IMA2018-166) 7.0  [no] [no]
Pseudopomite (heteropolyvanadate: IMA2021-064) 4.H0.  [no] [no]
Pseudorutile (tivanite: IMA1994 s.p., 1966 Rd) 4.CB.25    (IUPAC: diiron(III) trititanium(IV) nonaoxide)
Pseudosinhalite (IMA1997-014) 6.AC.10    (IUPAC: dimagnesium trialuminium hydro nonaoxodiborate)
Pseudowollastonite (IMA1962 s.p., 1959) 9.CA.20  [no] [no] (IUPAC: calcium trioxosilicate)
Pucherite (scheelite: 1871) 8.AD.40    (IUPAC: bismuth vanadate)
Pumpellyite (pumpellyite) 9.BG.20 (IUPAC: dicalcium metal dialuminium di(hydroxyl,oxy) heptaoxodisilicate tetraoxosilicate monohydrate)
Pumpellyite-(Al) (IMA2005-016) 9.BG.20   [no]
Pumpellyite-(Fe2+) (IMA1973 s.p., IMA1972-003) 9.BG.20   
Pumpellyite-(Fe3+) (IMA1973 s.p., IMA1972-003a) 9.BG.20   
Pumpellyite-(Mg) (IMA1973 s.p., 1925) 9.BG.20   
Pumpellyite-(Mn2+) (IMA1980-006) 9.BG.20   
Puninite (euchlorine: IMA2015-012) 7.0  [no] [no] (IUPAC: disodium tricopper oxotrisulfate) 
Punkaruaivite (IMA2008-018) 9.DB.15    (IUPAC: lithium {dititanium dihydroxyl [undecaoxytetrasilicate monohydroxyl]} monohydrate)
Purpurite (olivine: 1905) 8.AB.10    (IUPAC: (manganese(III),iron(III)) phosphate)
Pushcharovskite (IMA1995-048) 8.CA.55   
Putnisite (IMA2011-106) 5.0  [no] 
Putoranite (chalcopyrite: IMA1979-054) 02.CB.10b    (Cu1.1Fe1.2S2)
Putzite (argyrodite: IMA2002-024) 2.BA.70    (IUPAC: octa(copper,silver) hexasulfa germanide)
Pyatenkoite-(Y) (IMA1995-034) 9.DM.10   [no] (IUPAC: pentasodium yttrium titanium octadecaoxyhexasilicate hexahydrate)
Pyracmonite (IMA2008-029) 7.AC.08  [no]  (IUPAC: triammonium iron trisulfate)
Pyradoketosite (IMA2019-132) 2.0  [no] [no] (IUPAC: trisilver sulfantimonite)
Pyrargyrite (Y: 1831) 2.GA.05    (IUPAC: trisilver sulfantimonite)
Pyrite (pyrite: old) 2.EB.05a    (IUPAC: iron disulfide)
Pyroaurite (hydrotalcite: 1866 Rd) 5.DA.50    (IUPAC: hexamagnesium diiron(III) hexadecahydro carbonate tetrahydrate)
Pyrobelonite (descloizite: 1919) 8.BH.40    (IUPAC: lead manganese(II) hydro vanadate)
(Pyrochlore group (A2Nb2(O,OH)6Z), pyrochlore supergroup )
Pyrochroite (brucite: 1864) 4.FE.05    (IUPAC: manganese(II) dihydroxide)
Pyrolusite (rutile: IMA1982 s.p., 1827) 4.DB.05    (IUPAC: manganese(IV) dioxide)
Pyromorphite (apatite: 1813) 8.BN.05    (IUPAC: pentalead chloro triphosphate)
Pyrope (garnet, garnet: 1803) 9.AD.25    (IUPAC: trimagnesium dialuminium tri(tetraoxosilicate))
Pyrophanite (corundum: 1890) 4.CB.05    (IUPAC: manganese(II) titanium trioxide)
Pyrophyllite (pyrophyllite: 1829) 9.EC.10    (IUPAC: dialuminium decaoxotetrasilicate dihydroxyl)
Pyrosmalite 09.EE.10
Pyrosmalite-(Fe) (IMA1985-L, 1808) 9.EE.10    (IUPAC: octairon(II) pentadecaoxohexasilicate decahydroxyl)
Pyrosmalite-(Mn) (IMA2007 s.p., 1953) 9.EE.10    (IUPAC: octamanganese(II) pentadecaoxohexasilicate deca(hydroxyl,chlorine))
Pyrostilpnite (xanthoconite: 1868) 2.GA.10    (IUPAC: trisilver sulfantimonite)
Pyroxferroite (IMA1970-001) 9.DO.05    (IUPAC: iron(II) trioxosilicate)
Pyroxmangite (Y: 1913) 9.DO.05    (IUPAC: manganese(II) trioxosilicate)
Pyrrhotite (nickeline: 1835) 2.CC.10    (IUPAC: heptairon octasulfide)

Q

Qandilite (spinel, spinel: IMA1980-046) 4.BB.05   
Qaqarssukite-(Ce) (IMA2004-019) 5.BD.25   [no] (IUPAC: barium cerium fluoro dicarbonate)
Qatranaite (IMA2016-024) 4.FM.50  [no] [no]
Qeltite (IMA2021-032) 9.HA.  [no] [no]
Qilianshanite (IMA1992-008) 6.H0.55    (IUPAC: sodium tetrahydrogen carbonate borate dihydrate)
Qingheiite (alluaudite, wyllieite: IMA1981-051) 8.AC.15    (IUPAC: sodium manganese (magnesium aluminium) triphosphate)
Qingsongite (nitride: IMA2013-030) 1.BC.  [no] [no] (IUPAC: cubic boron nitride, borazon)
Qitianlingite (columbite: IMA1983-075) 4.DB.35   
Quadrandorite (lillianite: andorite IV and sundtit, 1893, 1954) 2.JB.40a   
Quadratite (IMA1994-038) 2.GC.25   [no]
Quadridavyne (cancrinite: IMA1990-054) 9.FB.05   
Quadruphite (seidozerite, murmanite: IMA1990-026) 9.BE.45     (IUPAC: octasodium di(calcio,sodio) tetrasodium tetratitanium di(heptaoxodisilicate) tetraphosphate tetraoxy difluoride)
Quartz (quartz: IMA1967 s.p., 1546) 4.DA.05    (IUPAC: dioxysilicate)
Queitite (IMA1978-029) 9.BF.20    (IUPAC: dizinc tetralead tetraoxysilicate heptaoxodisilicate sulfate)
Quenselite (Y: 1925) 4.FE.30    (IUPAC: lead manganese(III) hydro dioxide)
Quenstedtite (Y: 1888) 7.CB.65    (IUPAC: diiron(III) trisulfate undecahydrate)
Quetzalcoatlite (IMA1973-010) 4.FE.45   
Quijarroite (IMA2016-052) 2.LB.50  [no] [no] (Cu6HgPb2Bi4Se12)
Quintinite (hydrotalcite: IMA1992-028, IMA1992-029) 5.DA.40   [no] (IUPAC: tetramagnesium dialuminium dodecahydroxide carbonate trihydrate)
Qusongite (carbide: IMA2007-034) 1.BA.25   [no] (IUPAC: tungsten carbide)

External links
IMA Database of Mineral Properties/ RRUFF Project
Mindat.org - The Mineral Database
Webmineral.com
Mineralatlas.eu minerals P, Q and R